Procambarus regalis, sometimes called the regal burrowing crayfish, is a species of crayfish in the family Cambaridae. It is native to Texas and Arkansas, and is listed as Data Deficient on the IUCN Red List, although it may be a synonym of Procambarus steigmani.

References

Cambaridae
Freshwater crustaceans of North America
Taxonomy articles created by Polbot
Crustaceans described in 1988
Taxa named by Horton H. Hobbs Jr.